Rhagadillius aethiopicus is a species of beetle in the family Carabidae, the only species in the genus Rhagadillius.

References

Pterostichinae